Dennis Hextall (born April 17, 1943) is a former professional hockey forward who spent most of his career with the Minnesota North Stars and Detroit Red Wings. He is the son of Bryan Hextall, brother of Bryan Hextall Jr., uncle of Ron Hextall and sportscaster Leah Hextall, and great-uncle of AHL player Brett Hextall.

Personal

Hextall was born in Poplar Point, a community 33 km northeast of Portage la Prairie, Manitoba, in 1943.

Career
Hextall played two years at the University of North Dakota, then played briefly in the Eastern Hockey League, Central Professional Hockey League, and American Hockey League (AHL). He broke into the NHL with the New York Rangers during the 1968 playoffs. Over the next few years he jumped back and forth between the AHL and NHL, spending time with the Rangers, Los Angeles Kings and California Golden Seals. In 1972 he secured a spot with the Minnesota North Stars, for whom he played five seasons.  He then spent four seasons with the Detroit Red Wings and two more with the Washington Capitals.  In thirteen NHL seasons he played 681 games and recorded 153 goals, 350 assists, 503 points, and 1398 penalty minutes.

Hextall is currently on the board of directors of the Detroit Red Wings alumni team, and is active in its efforts to raise money for children's charities in Metro Detroit. He is also the coaching director for the Victory Honda AAA hockey club. In September 2009, Hextall was named the President and Commissioner of the International Hockey League, a mid-level minor hockey league based in the northern Midwestern United States.

Awards and honours

AHL Second All-Star Team (1969)
Played in NHL All-Star Game (1974 & 1975)
"Honoured Member" of the Manitoba Hockey Hall of Fame
 Member of the Manitoba Sports Hall of Fame (2008)

Career statistics

See also
Notable families in the NHL

References

External links

1943 births
Living people
Brandon Wheat Kings players
Buffalo Bisons (AHL) players
California Golden Seals players
Canadian ice hockey left wingers
Cleveland Barons (1937–1973) players
Detroit Red Wings captains
Detroit Red Wings players
Ice hockey people from Manitoba
Los Angeles Kings players
Minnesota North Stars players
Montreal Voyageurs players
New York Rangers players
Springfield Kings players
North Dakota Fighting Hawks men's ice hockey players
Washington Capitals players